In the run up to the November 2019 Spanish general election, various organisations carried out opinion polling to gauge the opinions that voters hold towards political leaders. Results of such polls are displayed in this article. The date range for these opinion polls is from the previous general election, held on 28 April 2019, to the day the next election was held, on 10 November 2019.

Preferred Prime Minister
The table below lists opinion polling on leader preferences to become Prime Minister.

Leader ratings
The table below lists opinion polling on leader ratings, on a 0–10 scale: 0 would stand for a "terrible" rating, whereas 10 would stand for "excellent".

Approval ratings
The tables below list the public approval ratings of the leaders and leading candidates of the main political parties in Spain.

Pedro Sánchez

Pablo Casado

Albert Rivera

Pablo Iglesias

Santiago Abascal

Notes

References